Josephine Gibbs (born 21 May 1938) is a British alpine skier. She competed in three events at the 1960 Winter Olympics.

References

1938 births
Living people
British female alpine skiers
Olympic alpine skiers of Great Britain
Alpine skiers at the 1960 Winter Olympics
Sportspeople from Worcester, England